The pencil fishes  are a family (Lebiasinidae) of freshwater fishes found in Costa Rica, Panama, and South America. They are usually small and are known as ornamental fishes in aquaria, including popular fishes such as the various pencil fish and the splashing tetra.

They prey on insect larvae, especially those of mosquitos. The family includes the voladoras (genera Lebiasina and Piabucina), mostly found in highlands of the north Andes, the Guiana Shield and Central America, but the other species are mainly lowland fish inhabiting the Orinoco, Amazon and Paraguay River basins, and rivers of the Guianas.

Genera
Around 67 species are placed in these genera:

Subfamily Lebiasininae - voladoras
Derhamia (one species)
Lebiasina (12 species)
Piabucina (9 species)
Subfamily Pyrrhulininae, tribe Pyrrhulinini
Copeina (two species)
Copella (9 species)
Pyrrhulina (17 species)
Subfamily Pyrrhulininae,  tribe Nannostomini
Nannostomus (17 species)

External links

 Nelson, Joseph S. (2006). Fishes of the World. John Wiley & Sons, Inc.